The Sammy Davis Jr. All-Star Spectacular is a 1962 studio album by Sammy Davis Jr. arranged by Morty Stevens. The first half of the album features Davis' impersonations of popular entertainers and celebrities.

Reception

Lindsay Planer of AllMusic commented that Davis had been recorded "like never before", both as a dynamic vocalist and as an actor of equally impressive proficiency. Planer described All-Star Spectacular as a unique album, capitalising on Davis' sizable talents as a "seminal master of melody and allowing for a peek into his infectious sense of humor".

Track listing 
 "That Lucky Old Sun" (Haven Gillespie, Beasley Smith) - 5:27 - In the style of Ray Charles and Frankie Laine
 "Be My Love" (Nicholas Brodszky, Sammy Cahn) - 3:28 - In the style of Mario Lanza and Louis Armstrong
 "Lulu's Back In Town" (Al Dubin, Harry Warren) - 2:57 - In the style of Mel Tormé and Jerry Lewis
 "Stranger in Paradise" (Mel Tormé, Robert Wells) - 2:40 - With impersonations of Tony Bennett (with speech impediments) and Billy Eckstine
 "Ballerina" (Bob Russell, Carl Sigman) - 2:57 - In the style of Huckleberry Hound, Kingfish from Amos 'n' Andy and Nat King Cole NOTE: The rereleased version currently on Spotify is over :30 shorter and omits all impersonations.
 "Sonny Boy" (Lew Brown, Buddy DeSylva, Ray Henderson, Al Jolson) - 4:01 - With impersonations of Al Jolson (the song's originator), James Cagney, Bela Lugosi, Jimmy Stewart, Dean Martin, Edward G. Robinson, Boris Karloff
 "I Married an Angel" (Lorenz Hart, Richard Rodgers) - 2:02
 "Falling in Love Again" (Frederick Hollander, Sammy Lerner) - 3:28
 "You Can't Love' Em All" (Sammy Cahn, Jimmy Van Heusen) - 3:10	
 "If You Are But a Dream" (Nat Bonx, Jack Fulton, Moe Jaffe) - 2:34
 "'Deed I Do" (Walter Hirsch, Fred Rose) - 2:14
 "Without a Song" (Edward Eliscu, Billy Rose, Vincent Youmans) - 3:39

Personnel 
 Sammy Davis Jr. – vocals
 Morty Stevens – arranger, conductor

References 

1962 albums
Sammy Davis Jr. albums
Reprise Records albums